Dalbergia tonkinensis (or sua) is a species of legume in the family Fabaceae. It is threatened by habitat loss and overexploitation for timber.

Furniture made from sua wood is particularly prized in China. While commercial sales of sua are banned in Vietnam, private sales and auctions are still permitted. Individual trees have sold for over a million US dollars.

References

tonkinensis
Trees of China
Trees of Vietnam
Vulnerable plants
Taxonomy articles created by Polbot
Plants described in 1901